This article presents the discography of all albums and singles released by the American pop rock group Cartel. It includes four studio albums, four extended plays, 8 singles and 7 music videos.

Cartel released their debut album Chroma via the Militia Group on  September 20, 2005. The album didn't do too well on the Billboard 200, only reaching number 140. It charted higher on the US Indie Chart at number 38 and peaked at number 2 on the Top Heatseekers Chart. Their first single,"Honestly", peaked at number 89 on the Billboard Hot 100 and the song went on to reach number 26 on the Billboard Mainstream Top 40. Their second single, "Say Anything (Else)", failed to make the Hot 100.

The band's second album, the self-titled Cartel, was released August 21, 2007 on their new label Epic Records. Cartel recorded their album in 20 days as part of the MTV show Band in a Bubble. The exposure from the MTV show helped the album. It charted at number 20 on the Billboard 200, becoming the group's highest chart performance to date. On the Billboard Top Rock albums it reached number 5. The first single taken from Cartel was called "Lose It", however it did not chart as expected. The second single "No Subject (Come with Me)", did poorly as did the third single "The Fortunate". Epic records dropped Cartel soon after.

Cartel's third album, Cycles, was released in October 2009. The group is now signed to Wind-up Records.  Cycles managed to chart at number 59 on the Billboard 200. The album also reached number 25 on the Billboard's Top Rock albums. "Let's Go" was the lead-off single released in July 2009. It didn't make the charts. The second single "The Perfect Mistake" was released in September and charted at number 39 on Pop Songs. The album's third single "Faster Ride" was released in August 2010.

The band's fourth studio album is titled Collider. The album was released independently by the group on March 26, 2013. It charted at number 141 on the Billboard 200 chart, reached number 40 on the Top Rock albums, and number 28 on the US Indie chart.

Albums

Studio albums

Extended plays

Singles

Album appearances

Music videos

References 

Pop music group discographies
Discographies of American artists
 
Rock music group discographies